The 2009 American Le Mans Series season was the 39th season for the IMSA GT Championship, with it being the eleventh season with the American Le Mans Series moniker. It began on March 21, 2009, and ended on October 10, 2009 after ten events. The series was composed of Le Mans Prototypes (LMP) and Grand Tourer (GT) race cars divided into four classes: LMP1, LMP2, GT1, and GT2. A fifth category, known as the Challenge class, was also added for select races and featured Porsche 997 GT3 Cup cars from the IMSA GT3 Cup Challenge. 2009 was also the final year for GT1, with Corvette Racing abandoning the class after Long Beach and switching over to much more competitive GT2 (renamed GT) class.

This was the first time that the Michelin Green X Challenge championship was used throughout a full ALMS season after its initial introduction at the 2008 Petit Le Mans. Two champions were determined by the entry which is the most efficient over the season within the LMP and GT categories.

Patrón Highcroft Racing duo David Brabham and Scott Sharp won the main LMP1 standings, holding off De Ferran Motorsports pairing Gil de Ferran and Simon Pagenaud at the final round of the season at Mazda Raceway Laguna Seca. Adrián Fernández and Luis Díaz won the LMP2 title, in the final season of Fernández Racing, who closed at the end of the 2009 season. In GT2, Flying Lizard Motorsports' Patrick Long and Jörg Bergmeister won six races en route to the championship title. Husband-and-wife Martin and Melanie Snow won the inaugural GT Challenge class title, that ran at half of the season's ten races.

Schedule
The 2009 schedule remained mostly identical to the 2008 schedule, although the season was shortened in length. This was done to allow teams from the American Le Mans Series to participate in events for the new Asian Le Mans Series in November. On December 18, 2008, it was announced that the Detroit race would be canceled.

The Challenge class of cars only participated in five rounds in 2009: Utah, Lime Rock, Mid-Ohio, Road America, and Laguna Seca.

Season results

Overall winner in bold.

Note that the GT1 class only competed in two rounds.  Johnny O'Connell, Jan Magnussen, and Antonio García won the 12 Hours of Sebring for Corvette Racing, while Oliver Gavin and Olivier Beretta won for Corvette at Long Beach.

Championships
Points were awarded to the top ten cars and drivers which either finish the race or complete 70% of the winner's distance, except in the ALMS Challenge category where cars and drivers only have to complete 50% of their class winner's distance.  Teams with multiple entries only scored the points of their highest finishing entry in each race.  Drivers were required to drive a minimum of 45 minutes to earn points, except for the Long Beach event which required only 30 minutes.  The GT1 category was only used for two events and no championships were awarded in that category.

Team championships
Teams with full entries were awarded points in the team championships.  Teams which participated in partial season or on a race by race basis were not counted as part of the championship.

LMP1 standings

LMP2 standings

GT2 standings

ALMS Challenge standings
Gruppe Orange tied on points for the ALMS Challenge Team Championship, but Snow Racing broke the tie by having three wins over the season compared to Gruppe Orange's one.

Driver championships
Drivers who participated in races but failed to score points over the course of the season are not listed.

LMP1 standings

LMP2 standings

GT2 standings

ALMS Challenge standings
Driver points were awarded collectively, with all the drivers who have driven for a team being awarded the same number of points.

Team changes
 Corvette Racing announced on September 9 that during the 2009 season the GT1 Corvettes will run at Sebring and Long Beach before competing at Le Mans, after which a new GT2 Corvette will compete for the rest of the season in preparation for 2010.
 Audi announced on December 5 that they will no longer compete in the American Le Mans Series, choosing instead to concentrate on the DTM, Intercontinental Le Mans Cup (later FIA World Endurance Championship) and 24 Hours of Le Mans. Audi's new LMP1 competitor, the R15 TDI, will compete at Sebring before returning to Europe. The cars returned for the Petit Le Mans in September.
Highcroft Racing and De Ferran Motorsports will move from LMP2 to campaign Acura's new LMP1 ARX-02a, while Lowe's Fernandez Racing will continue to race the ARX-01B in LMP2.
Porsche will not return with their factory-backed RS Spyders, campaigned by Penske Racing, choosing instead to compete on the Rolex Sports Car Series.
Dyson Racing will move from Porsche RS Spyders to AER Mazda-powered Lola B08/80's in the LMP2 class.
Paul Gentilozzi announced that RSR Racing would be entering Jaguar XKRs in the GT2 category beginning in July. This however, did not happen until a one car test session during the final Laguna Seca race, starting from the pit lane.
Team Cytosport acquired and ran an ex-Dyson Porsche RS Spyder from Mid-Ohio to the end of the season.

References

External links
 American Le Mans Series
 The International Motor Sports Association

 
American Le Mans Series seasons
American Le Mans Series
American Le Mans Series